Dikkatra Parvathi is a 1974 Tamil language film directed by Singeetam Srinivasa Rao based on a novel by the same name written by C. Rajagopalachari (Rajaji). The film stars Srikanth and Lakshmi. It won the National Film Award for Best Feature Film in Tamil, while Lakshmi won many accolades for her performance and was reported to have narrowly missed the National Film Award for Best Actress.

Plot 
The story espouses the evils of drink, Parvathi (Lakshmi) is a happy girl who recently married a loving husband, Karuppan (Srikanth). With kind parents-in-law and a doting husband, her life is blissful. Soon, she is blessed with a child. Karuppan wants to increase his earnings and decides to buy a cart, though Parvathi is unwilling, asserting it is happier to be content with what they have. However Karuppan takes a loan from a money lender and buys a cart. Initially, everything looks rosy. But Karuppan happens to cross the toddy shops on his way home. Slowly, he is initiated into the habit of drink and soon becomes an addict. Parvathi's life changes into one of hardship and woe. The neglect of Karuppan results in the death of the child. Parvathi's life becomes tragic. Karuppan is unable to repay the loan. The money lender's son takes advantage of the increasingly abominable attitude of her husband. Parvathi helplessly gives in to the approaches of the moneylender's son. Upon discovering this, Karuppan throws a scythe at the moneylender's son, nearly killing him. Karuppan is arrested. Parvathi is rejected by her kith and kin. Alone she struggles to get her husband released. On the advice of a lawyer, she makes a statement in the court that she is guilty, thinking it will facilitate the release of her husband. Karuppan is released, but angered by her statement, rejects her. Dismayed, Parvathi climbs up the hill and kills herself.

Cast 
 Lakshmi as Parvathi
 Srikanth as Karuppan
 Y. Gee. Mahendra
 Poornam Viswanathan
 Typist Gopu

Production 
The film was shot in Thorapalli, the birthplace of Rajaji, in a single 28-day schedule. The court scenes were shot in the actual court at Hosur and Chennai and the local lawyers participated, for the first time in Tamil cinema. The film's ₹2.5 lakh (worth ₹3.3 crore in 2021 prices) budget was 80 per cent funded by the Film Finance Corporation of India which was subsequently renamed National Film Development Corporation of India and set a precedent. When the producers and the director could not repay the loan, then Chief Minister of Tamil Nadu, M. G. Ramachandran, repaid the dues and purchased the film for the Tamil Nadu state. It was the first time in film history that a State Government had purchased a film after its release. The dialogues for the film were written by Karaikudi Narayanan.

It was the only film with a story based upon Rajaji's work. The signature of Rajaji in the letter of permission given to Singeetam Srinivasa Rao is the last signature of his life.

Awards 
 National Film Award for Best Feature Film in Tamil in 1975
 Filmfare Award for Best Actress – Tamil for Lakshmi in 1975
 Filmfare Award for Best Film – Tamil in 1975

Music 
Chitti Babu composed two songs for the film, the lyrics of which were written by Rajaji and Kannadasan; both were sung by Vani Jairam.

"Aagaayam Mazhai Pozhindaal" - Vani Jairam 
"Enna Kutram Seidheno" - Vani Jairam

Reception
Kanthan of Kalki praised the film for retaining the soul of original material while also praising the performances of cast, dialogues, music and cinematography.

References

External links 
 

1974 films
Films based on Indian novels
Films about alcoholism
1970s Tamil-language films
Films directed by Singeetam Srinivasa Rao
Best Tamil Feature Film National Film Award winners
Films scored by Chitti Babu